The bluebarred pygmy sunfish, Elassoma okatie, is a species of pygmy sunfish endemic to South Carolina, United States, where it prefers waters with dense vegetation growth in the Edisto and Savannah River drainages.  This species can reach  in total length.

References

Fish described in 1987
Fish of the United States
Endemic fauna of the United States
Elassoma
Taxonomy articles created by Polbot